The Saturn Award for Best Music is one of the annual awards given by the Academy of Science Fiction, Fantasy and Horror Films. The Saturn Awards, which are the oldest film-specialized awards to reward science fiction, fantasy, and horror achievements (the Hugo Award for Best Dramatic Presentation is the oldest award for science fiction and fantasy films), included the category for the first time as a juried award at the 2nd Saturn Awards in 1975, but was later given out competitively beginning with the 6th Saturn Awards in 1979 onward.

John Williams holds the record for the most nominations and wins with twenty and nine, respectively, including a juried double win in 1978.

Winners and nominees

1970s

1980s

1990s

2000s

2010s

2020s

Multiple nominations
20 nominations
 John Williams

17 nominations
 Jerry Goldsmith

16 nominations
 Danny Elfman

13 nominations
 Howard Shore
 Alan Silvestri

12 nominations
 Hans Zimmer

10 nominations
 Michael Giacchino

9 nominations
 James Horner

8 nominations
 John Powell

6 nominations
 Thomas Newman
 Christopher Young

5 nominations
 Alan Menken
 John Ottman

4 nominations
 John Carpenter
 James Newton Howard

3 nominations
 David Arnold
 Alexandre Desplat
 Maurice Jarre
 Marc Shaiman
 Ken Thorne

2 nominations
 Angelo Badalamenti
 John Barry
 Bruce Broughton
 Patrick Doyle
 Clint Eastwood
 Ludwig Göransson
 Harry Gregson-Williams
 Reinhold Heil
 Nathan Johnson
 Johnny Klimek
 Michael Nyman
 Trevor Rabin
 J. Peter Robinson
 Brian Tyler

Multiple wins
9 awards
 John Williams

7 awards
 Danny Elfman

3 awards
 James Horner
 Alan Silvestri
 Hans Zimmer

2 awards
 Michael Giacchino
 Alan Menken
 John Ottman
 Miklós Rózsa
 Howard Shore

External links
 
 IMDb: 2nd, 3rd, 4th, 5th, 6th, 7th, 8th, 9th, 10th, 11th, 12th, 13th, 14th, 15th, 16th, 17th, 18th, 19th, 20th, 21st, 22nd, 23rd, 24th, 25th, 26th, 27th, 28th, 29th, 30th, 31st, 32nd, 33rd, 34th, 35th, 36th, 37th, 38th, 39th, 40th, 41st, 42nd, 43rd, 44th, 45th, 46th, 47th

Music
Film music awards